Penarth-fawr, in the community of Llanystumdwy, Gwynedd, Wales is a medieval hall house dating from the mid 15th century.  Described in the Gwynedd Pevsner as "an important medieval hall house", Penarth-fawr is a Grade I listed building and a scheduled monument.

History and description

Cadw records Penarth-fawr as being built for Madog ap Howel ap Madog. Tree-ring dating of timbers used in the house gives a build date of around 1476. At the beginning of the 17th century, the house was extended and modernised. The former east wing, now a separate dwelling, was probably added at this time. In the 1930s the house was again remodelled to restore its medieval appearance, before passing into the care of the state in 1949. It is now administered by Cadw. A study of the house, Penarth Fawr: a history of a medieval hall-house, was published in 2002.

Penarth-fawr stands on a minor road off the A497 which runs from Pwllheli to Llanarmon. Cadw locates the house in the village of Llanystumdwy. The house is constructed of rubble stone under a modern slate roof. It was originally built to a hall house plan, with secondary rooms leading off the main hall, and separated by a cross-passage. The hall contains the house's most unique feature, a 'spere-truss' supporting the roof. No other example exists in Carnarvonshire, and few outside of North Wales. The house was enlarged with two wings in the Elizabethan era, but that to the south east was demolished around 1843.

Pevsner describes Penarth-fawr as "an important medieval hall house". It is both a Grade I listed building, and a Scheduled monument, its listing record noting that it is "one of the most important medieval gentry houses to survive in Wales". The stables, and the former wing to Penarth have their own Grade II listings.

Footnotes

References

Sources

External links
 
Castles of Wales entry for Penarth-fawr

Grade I listed buildings in Gwynedd
Cadw
Houses in Gwynedd
Grade I listed houses
Llanystumdwy
Hall houses